Sir Frank Watson Dyson, KBE, FRS, FRSE (8 January 1868 – 25 May 1939) was an English astronomer and the ninth Astronomer Royal who is remembered today largely for introducing time signals ("pips") from Greenwich, England, and for the role he played in proving Einstein's theory of general relativity.

Biography 
Dyson was born in Measham, near Ashby-de-la-Zouch, Leicestershire, the son of the Rev Watson Dyson, a Baptist minister, and his wife, Frances Dodwell. The family lived on St John Street in Wirksworth while Frank was one- to three-years-old. They moved to Yorkshire in his youth. There he attended Heath Grammar School, Halifax, and subsequently won scholarships to Bradford Grammar School and Trinity College, Cambridge, where he studied mathematics and astronomy, being placed Second Wrangler in 1889.

In 1894 he joined the Royal Astronomical Society, the British Astronomical Association and was given the post of Senior Assistant at Greenwich Observatory and worked on the Astrographic Catalogue, which was published in 1905. He was appointed Astronomer Royal for Scotland from 1905 to 1910, and Astronomer Royal (and Director of the Royal Greenwich Observatory) from 1910 to 1933. In 1928, he introduced in the Observatory a new free-pendulum clock, the most accurate clock available at that time and organised the regular wireless transmission from the GPO wireless station at Rugby of Greenwich Mean Time. He also, in 1924, introduced the distribution of the "six pips" via the BBC. He was for several years President of the British Horological Institute and was awarded their gold medal in 1928.

Dyson was noted for his study of solar eclipses and was an authority on the spectrum of the corona and on the chromosphere.  He is credited with organising expeditions to observe the 1919 solar eclipse at Brazil and Príncipe, which he somewhat optimistically began preparing for prior to the Armistice of 11 November 1918. Dyson presented his observations of the solar eclipse of May 29, 1919 to a joint meeting of the Royal Society and Royal Astronomical Society on 6 November 1919. The observations confirmed Albert Einstein's theory of the effect of gravity on light which until that time had been received with some scepticism by the scientific community.

Dyson died on board a ship while travelling from Australia to England in 1939, and was buried at sea.

Honours and awards 

 Fellow of the Royal Society – 1901
 Fellow of the Royal Society of Edinburgh – 1906
 President, Royal Astronomical Society – 1911–1913
 Vice-president, Royal Society – 1913–1915
 Knighted – 1915
 President, British Astronomical Association, 1916–1918
 Royal Medal of the Royal Society – 1921
 Bruce Medal of the Astronomical Society of the Pacific – 1922
 Gold Medal of the Royal Astronomical Society – 1925
 Knight Commander of the Order of the British Empire – 1926
 Gold medal of British Horological Institute – 1928
 President of the International Astronomical Union – 1928–1932
 Between 1894–1906, Dyson lived at 6 Vanbrugh Hill, Blackheath, London SE3, in a house now marked by a blue plaque.
 The crater Dyson on the Moon is named after him, as is the asteroid 1241 Dysona.

Family

In 1894 he married Caroline Bisset Best (d.1937), the daughter of Palemon Best, with whom he had two sons and six daughters.

Frank Dyson and Freeman Dyson
Although Frank Dyson and theoretical physicist Freeman Dyson were not known to be related, their fathers Rev Watson Dyson and George Dyson both hailed from West Yorkshire where the surname originates and is most densely clustered. Freeman Dyson credited Sir Frank with sparking his interest in astronomy: because they shared the same last name, Sir Frank's achievements were discussed by Freeman Dyson's family when he was a young boy. Inspired, Dyson's first attempt at writing was a 1931 piece of juvenilia entitled "Sir Phillip Robert's Erolunar Collision" – Sir Philip being a thinly disguised version of Sir Frank.

In popular media 
Actor Alec McCowen was cast as Sir Frank Dyson in the TV series, Longitude in 2000.

Selected writings 
 Astronomy, Frank Dyson, London, Dent, 1910

See also
Einstein and Eddington

References

External links 
 Online catalogue of Dyson's working papers (part of the Royal Greenwich Observatory Archives held at Cambridge University Library)
 Bruce Medal page
 Awarding of Bruce Medal: PASP 34 (1922) 2
 Awarding of RAS gold medal: MNRAS 85 (1925) 672
 Astronomische Nachrichten 268 (1939) 395/396 (one line)
 Monthly Notices of the Royal Astronomical Society 100 (1940) 238
 The Observatory 62 (1939) 179
 Publications of the Astronomical Society of the Pacific 51 (1939) 336

1868 births
1939 deaths
Astronomers Royal
People who died at sea
Burials at sea
20th-century British astronomers
People from Measham
Royal Medal winners
People educated at Bradford Grammar School
Fellows of the Royal Society
Foreign associates of the National Academy of Sciences
Knights Commander of the Order of the British Empire
Second Wranglers
Recipients of the Bruce Medal
Recipients of the Gold Medal of the Royal Astronomical Society
Presidents of the Institute of Physics
People educated at Heath Grammar School
Academics of the University of Edinburgh
Presidents of the Royal Astronomical Society
Presidents of the International Astronomical Union